Albert Edward "Dolly" Swift (January 30, 1866 – April 20, 1948) was a Canadian amateur ice hockey forward who was active in the 1880s and 1890s. Swift played predominantly for his hometown club Quebec Hockey Club of the Amateur Hockey Association of Canada. He also spent some time with the Montreal Victorias. He was the most successful goal scorer of the 1890s.

Swift later became a general within the Canadian army and appeared with a battalion in World War I.

Statistics

Statistics per SIHR at sihrhockey.org

References

Notes

1866 births
Year of death missing
Anglophone Quebec people
Canadian ice hockey forwards
Canadian military personnel of World War I
Montreal Victorias players
Ice hockey people from Quebec City
Quebec Bulldogs players